Burns Junction is an unincorporated community in Malheur County, Oregon, United States, at the intersection of U.S. Route 95 and Oregon Route 78, about  southeast of the Harney County city of Burns.

Climate
According to the Köppen Climate Classification system, Burns Junction has a semi-arid climate, abbreviated "BSk" on climate maps.

References

Unincorporated communities in Malheur County, Oregon
Unincorporated communities in Oregon